Although most compounds are referred to by their IUPAC systematic names (following IUPAC nomenclature), traditional names have also been kept where they are in wide use or of significant historical interests.

A

Ac 

 Actinium(III) chloride – 
 Actinium(III) fluoride – 
 Actinium(III) oxide –

Al 
 Aluminium antimonide – AlSb
 Aluminium arsenate – 
 Aluminium arsenide – AlAs
 Aluminium diboride – 
 Aluminium bromide – 
 Aluminium carbide – 
 Aluminium iodide – 
 Aluminium nitride – AlN
 Aluminium oxide – 
 Aluminium phosphide – AlP
 Aluminium chloride – 
 Aluminium fluoride – 
 Aluminium hydroxide – 
 Aluminium nitrate – 
 Aluminium sulfide – 
 Aluminium sulfate – 
 Aluminium potassium sulfate –

Am 
 Americium(II) bromide − 
 Americium(III) bromide − 
 Americium(II) chloride − 
 Americium(III) chloride – 
 Americium(III) fluoride − 
 Americium(IV) fluoride − 
 Americium(II) iodide − 
 Americium(III) iodide − 
 Americium dioxide –

/ 
 Ammonia – 
 Ammonium azide – 
 Ammonium bicarbonate – 
 Ammonium bisulfate – 
 Ammonium bromide – 
 Ammonium chromate – 
 Ammonium cerium(IV) nitrate – 
 Ammonium cerium(IV) sulfate – 
 Ammonium chloride – 
 Ammonium chlorate – 
 Ammonium cyanide – 
 Ammonium dichromate – 
 Ammonium dihydrogen phosphate – 
 Ammonium hexafluoroaluminate – AlF6H12 N3
 Ammonium hexafluorophosphate – F6H4 NP 
 Ammonium hexachloroplatinate – 
 Ammonium hexafluorosilicate
 Ammonium hexafluorotitanate
 Ammonium hexafluorozirconate
 Ammonium hydroxide – 
 Ammonium nitrate – 
 Ammonium orthomolybdate – 
 Ammonium sulfamate – 
 Ammonium sulfide – 
 Ammonium sulfite – 
 Ammonium sulfate – 
 Ammonium perchlorate – 
 Ammonium permanganate – 
 Ammonium persulfate – 
 Ammonium diamminetetrathiocynatochromate(III) – 
 Ammonium thiocyanate – 
 Ammonium triiodide – 
 Diammonium dioxido(dioxo)molybdenum – 
 Diammonium phosphate – 
 Tetramethylammonium perchlorate –

Sb 
 Antimony hydride (stybine) – 
 Antimony pentachloride – 
 Antimony pentafluoride – 
 Antimony potassium tartrate – 
 Antimony sulfate – 
 Antimony trichloride – 
 Antimony trifluoride – 
 Antimony trioxide – 
 Antimony trisulfide – 
 Antimony pentasulfide –

Ar 
 Argon fluorohydride – HArF

As 
 Arsenic trifluoride – 
 Arsenic triiodide –AsI3
 Arsenic pentafluoride – 
 Arsenic trioxide (Arsenic(III) oxide) – 
 Arsenous acid – 
 Arsenic acid – 
 Arsine –

B

Ba 
 Barium azide – 
 Barium bromide – 
 Barium carbonate – 
 Barium chlorate – 
 Barium chloride – 
 Barium chromate – 
 Barium ferrate – 
 Barium ferrite – 
 Barium fluoride – 
 Barium hydroxide – 
 Barium iodide – 
 Barium manganate – 
 Barium nitrate – 
 Barium oxalate – 
 Barium oxide – BaO
 Barium permanganate – 
 Barium peroxide – 
 Barium sulfate – 
 Barium sulfide – BaS
 Barium titanate – 
 Barium thiocyanate –

Be 
 Beryllium borohydride – 
 Beryllium bromide – 
 Beryllium carbonate – 
 Beryllium chloride – 
 Beryllium fluoride – 
 Beryllium hydride – 
 Beryllium hydroxide – 
 Beryllium iodide – 
 Beryllium nitrate – 
 Beryllium nitride – 
 Beryllium oxide – BeO
 Beryllium sulfate – 
 Beryllium sulfite – 
 Beryllium telluride – BeTe

Bi 
 Bismuth chloride – BiCl3
 Bismuth hydroxide–BiH3O3
 Bismuth(III) iodide–BiI3
 Bismuth(III) nitrate–BiN3O9
 Bismuth(III) oxide – 
 Bismuth(III) sulfide– Bi2S3
 Bismuth(III) telluride – 
 Bismuth ferrite – 
 Bismuth oxychloride – BiOCl
 Bismuth pentafluoride – 
 Bismuth tribromide –

B 
 Borane – 
 Borax – 
 Borazine – 
 Borazocine ((3Z,5Z,7Z)-azaborocine) – 
 Boric acid – 
 Boron carbide – 
 Boron nitride – BN
 Boron suboxide – 
 Boron tribromide – 
 Boron trichloride – 
 Boron trifluoride – 
 Boron triiodide –BI3 
 Boron oxide – 
 Boroxine – 
 Decaborane – 
 Diborane – 
 Diboron tetrafluoride – 
 Pentaborane – 
 Tetraborane –

Br 
 Bromine monochloride – BrCl
 Bromine pentafluoride – 
 Perbromic acid – 
 Aluminium Bromide – 
 Ammonium bromide – 
 Boron tribromide – 
 Bromic acid – 
 Bromine monoxide – 
 Bromine pentafluoride – 
 Bromine trifluoride – 
 Bromine monofluoride – BrF
 Calcium bromide – 
 Carbon tetrabromide – 
 Copper(I) bromide – CuBr
 Copper(II) bromide – 
 Hydrobromic acid – HBr(aq)
 Hydrogen bromide – HBr
 Hypobromous acid – HOBr
 Iodine monobromide – IBr
 Iron(II) bromide – 
 Iron(III) bromide – 
 Lead(II) bromide – 
 Lithium bromide – LiBr
 Magnesium bromide – 
 Mercury(I) bromide – 
 Mercury(II) bromide – 
 Nitrosyl bromide – NOBr
 Phosphorus pentabromide – 
 Phosphorus tribromide – 
 Phosphorus heptabromide – PBr7
 Potassium bromide – KBr
 Potassium bromate – 
 Potassium perbromate – 
 Tribromosilane – 
 Silicon tetrabromide – 
 Silver bromide – AgBr
 Sodium bromide – NaBr
 Sodium bromate – 
 Sodium perbromate – 
 Thionyl bromide – 
 Tin(II) bromide – 
 Zinc bromide –

C

Cd 
 Cadmium arsenide – 
 Cadmium bromide – 
 Cadmium chloride – 
 Cadmium fluoride – 
 Cadmium iodide – 
 Cadmium nitrate – 
 Cadmium oxide – CdO
 Cadmium phosphide – 
 Cadmium selenide – CdSe
 Cadmium sulfate – 
 Cadmium sulfide – CdS
 Cadmium telluride – CdTe

Cs 
 Caesium bicarbonate – 
 Caesium carbonate – 
 Caesium chloride – CsCl
 Caesium chromate – 
 Caesium fluoride – CsF
 Caesium hydride – CsH
 Caesium hydrogen sulfate – 
 Caesium iodide – CsI
 Caesium sulfate –

Cf 
 Californium(III) bromide – 
 Californium(III) carbonate – 
 Californium(III) chloride – 
 Californium(III) fluoride – 
 Californium(III) iodide – 
 Californium(II) iodide – 
 Californium(III) nitrate – 
 Californium(III) oxide – 
 Californium(III) phosphate – 
 Californium(III) sulfate – 
 Californium(III) sulfide – 
 Californium oxyfluoride – CfOF
 Californium oxychloride – CfOCl

Ca 
 Calcium bromide – 
 Calcium carbide – 
 Calcium carbonate (Precipitated Chalk) – 
 Calcium chlorate – 
 Calcium chloride – 
 Calcium chromate – 
 Calcium cyanamide – 
 Calcium fluoride – 
 Calcium hydride – 
 Calcium hydroxide – 
 Calcium monosilicide – CaSi
 Calcium oxalate – 
 Calcium oxychloride – 
 Calcium perchlorate – 
 Calcium permanganate – 
 Calcium sulfate (gypsum) –

C 
 Carbon dioxide – 
 Carbon disulfide – 
 Carbon monoxide – CO
 Carbon tetrabromide – 
 Carbon tetrachloride – 
 Carbon tetrafluoride – 
 Carbon tetraiodide – 
 Carbonic acid – 
 Carbonyl chloride – 
 Carbonyl fluoride – 
 Carbonyl sulfide – COS
 Carboplatin –

Ce 
 Cerium(III) bromide – 
 Cerium(III) carbonate – 
 Cerium(III) chloride – 
 Cerium(III) fluoride – 
 Cerium(III) hydroxide – 
 Cerium(III) iodide – 
 Cerium(III) nitrate – 
 Cerium(III) oxide – 
 Cerium(III) sulfate – 
 Cerium(III) sulfide – 
 Cerium(IV) hydroxide – 
 Cerium(IV) nitrate – 
 Cerium(IV) oxide – 
 Cerium(IV) sulfate – 
 Cerium(III,IV) oxide – 
 Ceric ammonium nitrate – 
 Cerium hexaboride – 
 Cerium aluminium – CeAl
 Cerium cadmium – CeCd
 Cerium magnesium – CeMg
 Cerium mercury – CeHg
 Cerium silver – CeAg
 Cerium thallium – CeTl
 Cerium zinc – CeZn

Cl 
 Actinium(III) chloride – 
 Aluminium chloride – 
 Americium(III) chloride – 
 Ammonium chloride – 
 Antimony(III) chloride – 
 Antimony(V) chloride – 
 Arsenic(III) chloride – 
 Barium chloride – 
 Beryllium chloride – 
 Bismuth(III) chloride – 
 Boron trichloride – 
 Bromine monochloride – BrCl
 Cadmium chloride – 
 Caesium chloride – CsCl
 Calcium chloride – 
 Calcium hypochlorite – 
 Carbon tetrachloride – 
 Cerium(III) chloride – 
 Chloramine – 
 Chloric acid – 
 Chlorine azide – 
 Chlorine dioxide – 
 Chlorine dioxide – 
 Chlorine monofluoride – ClF
 Chlorine monoxide – ClO
 Chlorine pentafluoride – 
 Chlorine perchlorate – 
 Chlorine tetroxide – 
 Chlorine trifluoride – 
 Chlorine trifluoride – 
 Chlorine trioxide – 
 Chlorine trioxide – 
 Chloroplatinic acid – 
 Chlorosulfonic acid – 
 Chlorosulfonyl isocyanate – 
 Chloryl fluoride – 
 Chromium(II) chloride – 
 Chromium(III) chloride – 
 Chromyl chloride – 
 Cisplatin (cis–platinum(II) chloride diamine) – 
 Cobalt(II) chloride – 
 Copper(I) chloride – CuCl
 Copper(II) chloride – 
 Curium(III) chloride – 
 Cyanogen chloride – ClCN
 Dichlorine dioxide – 
 Dichlorine heptaoxide – 
 Dichlorine heptoxide – 
 Dichlorine hexoxide – 
 Dichlorine monoxide – 
 Dichlorine monoxide – 
 Dichlorine tetroxide (chlorine perchlorate) – 
 Dichlorine trioxide – 
 Dichlorosilane – 
 Disulfur dichloride – 
 Dysprosium(III) chloride – 
 Erbium(III) chloride – 
 Europium(II) chloride – 
 Europium(III) chloride – 
 Gadolinium(III) chloride – 
 Gallium trichloride – 
 Germanium dichloride – 
 Germanium tetrachloride – 
 Gold(I) chloride – AuCl
 Gold(III) chloride – 
 Hafnium(IV) chloride – 
 Holmium(III) chloride – 
 Hydrochloric acid – HCl(aq)
 Hydrogen chloride – HCl
 Hypochlorous acid – HOCl
 Indium(I) chloride – InCl
 Indium(III) chloride – 
 Iodine monochloride – ICl
 Iridium(III) chloride – 
 Iron(II) chloride – 
 Iron(III) chloride – 
 Lanthanum chloride – 
 Lead(II) chloride – 
 Lithium chloride – LiCl
 Lithium perchlorate – 
 Lutetium chloride – 
 Magnesium chloride – 
 Magnesium perchlorate – 
 Manganese(II) chloride – 
 Mercury(I) chloride – 
 Mercury(II) chloride – 
 Mercury(II) perchlorate – 
 Molybdenum(III) chloride – 
 Molybdenum(V) chloride – 
 Neodymium(III) chloride – 
 Neptunium(IV) chloride – 
 Nickel(II) chloride – 
 Niobium oxide trichloride – 
 Niobium(IV) chloride – 
 Niobium(V) chloride – 
 Nitrogen trichloride – 
 Nitrosyl chloride – NOCl
 Nitryl chloride – 
 Osmium(III) chloride – 
 Palladium(II) chloride – 
 Perchloric acid – 
 Perchloryl fluoride – 
 Phosgene – 
 Phosphonitrilic chloride trimer – 
 Phosphorus oxychloride – 
 Phosphorus pentachloride – 
 Phosphorus trichloride – 
 Platinum(II) chloride – 
 Platinum(IV) chloride – 
 Plutonium(III) chloride – 
 Potassium chlorate – 
 Potassium chloride – KCl
 Potassium perchlorate – 
 Praseodymium(III) chloride – 
 Protactinium(V) chloride – 
 Radium chloride – 
 Rhenium(III) chloride – 
 Rhenium(V) chloride – 
 Rhodium(III) chloride – 
 Rubidium chloride – RbCl
 Ruthenium(III) chloride – 
 Samarium(III) chloride – 
 Scandium chloride – 
 Selenium dichloride – 
 Selenium tetrachloride – 
 Silicon tetrachloride – 
 Silver chloride – AgCl
 Silver perchlorate – 
 Sodium chlorate – 
 Sodium chloride (table salt, rock salt) – NaCl
 Sodium chlorite – 
 Sodium hypochlorite – NaOCl
 Sodium perchlorate – 
 Strontium chloride – 
 Sulfur dichloride – 
 Sulfuryl chloride – 
 Tantalum(III) chloride – 
 Tantalum(IV) chloride – 
 Tantalum(V) chloride – 
 Tellurium tetrachloride – 
 Terbium(III) chloride – 
 Tetrachloroauric acid – 
 Thallium(I) chloride – TlCl
 Thallium(III) chloride – 
 Thionyl chloride – 
 Thiophosgene – 
 Thorium(IV) chloride – 
 Thulium(III) chloride – 
 Tin(II) chloride – 
 Tin(IV) chloride – 
 Titanium tetrachloride – 
 Titanium(III) chloride – 
 Trichlorosilane – 
 Trigonal bipyramidal – 
 Tungsten(IV) chloride – 
 Tungsten(V) chloride – 
 Tungsten(VI) chloride – 
 Uranium hexachloride – 
 Uranium(III) chloride – 
 Uranium(IV) chloride – 
 Uranium(V) chloride – 
 Uranyl chloride – 
 Vanadium oxytrichloride – 
 Vanadium(II) chloride – 
 Vanadium(III) chloride – 
 Vanadium(IV) chloride – 
 Ytterbium(III) chloride – 
 Yttrium chloride – 
 Zinc chloride – 
 Zirconium(IV) chloride –

Cr 
 Chromic acid – 
 Chromium trioxide (Chromic acid) – 
 Chromium(II) chloride (chromous chloride) – 
 Chromium(II) sulfate – 
 Chromium(III) chloride – 
 Chromium(III) nitrate – 
 Chromium(III) oxide – 
 Chromium(III) sulfate – 
 Chromium(III) telluride – 
 Chromium(IV) oxide – 
 Chromium pentafluoride – 
 Chromyl chloride – 
 Chromyl fluoride –

Co 
 Cobalt(II) bromide – 
 Cobalt(II) carbonate – 
 Cobalt(II) chloride – 
 Cobalt(II) nitrate – 
 Cobalt(II) sulfate – 
 Cobalt(III) fluoride –

Cu 
 Copper(I) acetylide – 
 Copper(I) chloride – CuCl
 Copper(I) fluoride – CuF
 Copper(I) oxide – 
 Copper(I) sulfate – 
 Copper(I) sulfide – 
 Copper(II) azide – 
 Copper(II) borate – Cu3(BO3)2
 Copper(II) carbonate – 
 Copper(II) chloride – 
 Copper(II) hydroxide – 
 Copper(II) nitrate – 
 Copper(II) oxide – CuO
 Copper(II) sulfate – 
 Copper(II) sulfide – CuS
 Copper oxychloride – 
 Tetramminecopper(II) sulfate –

Cm 
 Curium(III) chloride – 
 Curium(III) oxide – 
 Curium(IV) oxide – 
 Curium hydroxide –

CN 
 Cyanogen bromide – BrCN
 Cyanogen chloride – ClCN
 Cyanogen iodide – ICN
 Cyanogen – 
 Cyanuric chloride – 
 Cyanogen thiocyanate – 
 Cyanogen selenocyanate – 
 Cyanogen azide –

D 
 Disilane – 
 Disulfur dichloride –

Dy 
 Dysprosium(III) chloride – 
 Dysprosium oxide – 
 Dysprosium titanate –

E

Es 
 Einsteinium(III) bromide – 
 Einsteinium(III) carbonate – 
 Einsteinium(III) chloride – 
 Einsteinium(III) fluoride – 
 Einsteinium(III) iodide – 
 Einsteinium(III) nitrate – 
 Einsteinium(III) oxide – 
 Einsteinium(III) phosphate – 
 Einsteinium(III) sulfate – 
 Einsteinium(III) sulfide –

Er 
 Erbium(III) chloride – 
 Erbium-copper – ErCu
 Erbium-gold – ErAu
 Erbium(III) oxide – 
 Erbium-silver – ErAg
 Erbium-Iridium – ErIr

Eu 
 Europium(II) chloride – 
 Europium(II) sulfate – 
 Europium(III) bromide – 
 Europium(III) chloride – 
 Europium(III) iodate – 
 Europium(III) iodide – 
 Europium(III) nitrate – 
 Europium(III) oxide – 
 Europium(III) perchlorate – 
 Europium(III) sulfate – 
 Europium(III) vanadate –

F

F 
 Fluoroantimonic acid – 
 Tetrafluorohydrazine – 
 Trifluoromethylisocyanide – 
 Trifluoromethanesulfonic acid – 
 Other fluorides: AlF3, AmF3, NH4F, NH4HF2, NH4BF4, SbF5, SbF3, AsF5, AsF3, BaF2, BeF2, BiF3, F5SOOSF5, BF3, BrF5, BrF3, BrF, CdF2, CsF, CaF2, CF4, COF2, CeF3, CeF4, ClF5, ClF3, ClF, CrF3, CrF5, CrO2F2, CoF2, CoF3, CuF, CuF2, CmF3, N2F2, N2F4, O2F2, P2F4, S2F2, DyF3, ErF3, EuF3, HBF4, FN3, FOSO2F, FNO3, FSO3H, GdF3, GaF3, GeF4, AuF3, HfF4, H2SbF6, HPF6, H2SiF6, H2TiF6, HF, HF(aq), HFO, InF3, IF7, IF, IF5, IrF3, IrF6, FeF2, FeF3, KrF2, LaF3, PbF2, PbF4, LiF, MgF2, MnF2, MnF3, MnF4, Hg2F2, HgF2, MoF3, MoF5, MoF6, NbF4, NbF5, NdF3, NiF2, NpF4, NpF5, NpF6, ONF3, NF3, NO2BF4, NOBF4, NOF, NO2F, OsF4, OsF6, OsF7, OF2, PdF2, PdF4, FSO2OOSO2F, POF3, PF5, PF3, PtF2, PtF4, PtF6, PuF3, PuF4, PuF6, KF, KPF6, KBF4, PrF3, PaF5, RaF2, RnF2, ReF4, ReF6, ReF7, RhF3, RbF, RuF3, RuF4, RuF6, SmF3, ScF3, SeF6, SeF4, SiF4, AgF, AgF2, AgBF4, NaF, NaFSO3, Na3AlF6, NaSbF6, NaPF6, Na2SiF6, Na2TiF6, NaBF4, SrF2, SF2, SF6, SF4, SO2F2, TaF5, TcF6, TeF6, TeF4, TlF, TlF3, SOF2, ThF4, SnF2, SnF4, TiF3, TiF4, HSiF3, WF6, UF4, UF5, UF6, UO2F2, VF3, VF4, VF5, XeF2, XeO2F2, XeF6, XePtF6, XeF4, YbF3, YF3, ZnF2, ZrF4

Fr 
 Francium oxide – 
 Francium chloride – FrCl
 Francium bromide – FrBr
 Francium iodide – FrI
 Francium carbonate – 
 Francium hydroxide – FrOH
 Francium sulfate –

G

Gd 
 Gadolinium(III) chloride – 
 Gadolinium(III) oxide – 
 Gadolinium(III) carbonate – 
 Gadolinium(III) chloride – 
 Gadolinium(III) fluoride – 
 Gadolinium gallium garnet – 
 Gadolinium(III) nitrate – 
 Gadolinium(III) oxide – 
 Gadolinium(III) phosphate – 
 Gadolinium(III) sulfate –

Ga 
 Gallium antimonide – GaSb
 Gallium arsenide – GaAs
 Gallium(III) fluoride – 
 Gallium trichloride – 
 Gallium nitride – GaN
 Gallium phosphide – GaP
 Gallium(II) sulfide – GaS
 Gallium(III) sulfide –

Ge 
 Digermane – 
 Germane – 
 Germanium(II) bromide – 
 Germanium(II) chloride – 
 Germanium(II) fluoride – 
 Germanium(II) iodide – 
 Germanium(II) oxide – GeO
 Germanium(II) selenide – GeSe
 Germanium(II) sulfide – GeS
 Germanium(IV) bromide – 
 Germanium(IV) chloride – 
 Germanium(IV) fluoride – 
 Germanium(IV) iodide – 
 Germanium(IV) nitride – 
 Germanium(IV) oxide – 
 Germanium(IV) selenide – 
 Germanium(IV) sulfide – 
 Germanium difluoride – 
 Germanium dioxide – 
 Germanium tetrachloride – 
 Germanium tetrafluoride – 
 Germanium telluride – GeTe

Au 
 Gold(I) bromide – AuBr
 Gold(I) chloride – AuCl
 Gold(I) hydride – AuH
 Gold(I) iodide – AuI
 Gold(I) selenide – 
 Gold(I) sulfide – 
 Gold(III) bromide – 
 Gold(III) chloride – 
 Gold(III) fluoride – 
 Gold(III) iodide – 
 Gold(III) oxide – 
 Gold(III) selenide – 
 Gold(III) sulfide – 
 Gold(III) nitrate – 
 Gold(V) fluoride – 
 Gold(I,III) chloride – 
 Gold ditelluride – 
 Gold heptafluoride – 

H

Hf 
 Hafnium(IV) bromide – 
 Hafnium(IV) carbide – HfC
 Hafnium(IV) chloride – 
 Hafnium(IV) fluoride – 
 Hafnium(IV) iodide – 
 Hafnium(IV) oxide – 
 Hafnium(IV) silicate – 
 Hafnium(IV) sulfide – 
 Hexadecacarbonylhexarhodium –

Ho 
 Holmium(III) carbonate – 
 Holmium(III) chloride – 
 Holmium(III) fluoride – 
 Holmium(III) nitrate – 
 Holmium(III) oxide – 
 Holmium(III) phosphate – 
 Holmium(III) sulfate –

H 
 Hexafluorosilicic acid – 
 Hydrazine – 
 Hydrazoic acid – 
 Hydroiodic acid – HI
 Hydrogen bromide – HBr
 Hydrogen chloride – HCl
 Hydrogen cyanide – HCN
 Hydrogen fluoride – HF
 Hydrogen peroxide – 
 Hydrogen selenide – 
 Hydrogen sulfide – 
 Hydrogen telluride – 
 Hydroxylamine – 
 Hypobromous acid – HBrO
 Hypochlorous acid – HClO
 Hypophosphorous acid – 
 Metaphosphoric acid – 
 Protonated molecular hydrogen – 
 Trioxidane – 
 Water - H2O

He
 Sodium helide –

I

In 
 Indium(I) bromide – InBr
 Indium(III) bromide – 
 Indium(III) chloride – 
 Indium(III) fluoride – 
 Indium(III) oxide – 
 Indium(III) sulfate – 
 Indium antimonide – InSb
 Indium arsenide – InAs
 Indium nitride – InN
 Indium phosphide – InP
 Indium(I) iodide – InI
 Indium(III) nitrate – 
 Indium(I) oxide – 
 Indium(III) selenide – 
 Indium(III) sulfide – 
 Trimethylindium –

I 
 Iodic acid – 
 Iodine heptafluoride – 
 Iodine pentafluoride – 
 Iodine monochloride – ICl
 Iodine trichloride – 
 Periodic acid – 
 Iodine pentachloride - 
 Iodine tribromide -

Ir 
 Iridium(IV) chloride – 
 Iridium(V) fluoride – 
 Iridium hexafluoride – 
 Iridium tetrafluoride –

Fe 
 Columbite – 
 Iron(II) chloride – 
 Iron(II) oxalate – 
 Iron(II) oxide – FeO
 Iron(II) selenate – 
 Iron(II) sulfate – 
 Iron(III) chloride – 
 Iron(III) fluoride – 
 Iron(III) oxalate – 
 Iron(III) oxide – 
 Iron(III) nitrate – 
 Iron(III) sulfate – 
 Iron(III) thiocyanate – 
 Iron(II,III) oxide – 
 Iron ferrocyanide – 
 Prussian blue (Iron(III) hexacyanoferrate(II)) – 
 Ammonium iron(II) sulfate – 
 Iron(II) bromide – 
 Iron(III) bromide – 
 Iron(II) chloride – 
 Iron(III) chloride – 
 Iron disulfide – 
 Iron dodecacarbonyl – 
 Iron(III) fluoride – 
 Iron(II) iodide – 
 Iron naphthenate – 
 Iron(III) nitrate – 
 Iron nonacarbonyl – 
 Iron(II) oxalate – 
 Iron(II,III) oxide – 
 Iron(III) oxide – 
 Iron pentacarbonyl – 
 Iron(III) perchlorate – 
 Iron(III) phosphate – 
 Iron(II) sulfamate – 
 Iron(II) sulfate – 
 Iron(III) sulfate – 
 Iron(II) sulfide – FeS

K

Kr 
 Krypton difluoride –

L

La 
 Lanthanum aluminium – LaAl
 Lanthanum cadmium – LaCd
 Lanthanum carbonate – 
 Lanthanum magnesium – LaMg
 Lanthanum manganite – 
 Lanthanum mercury – LaHg
 Lanthanum silver – LaAg
 Lanthanum thallium – LaTl
 Lanthanum zinc – LaZn
 Lanthanum boride – 
 Lanthanum carbonate – 
 Lanthanum(III) chloride – 
 Lanthanum trifluoride – 
 Lanthanum(III) oxide – 
 Lanthanum(III) nitrate – 
 Lanthanum(III) phosphate – 
 Lanthanum(III) sulfate –

Pb 
 Lead(II) azide – 
 Lead(II) bromide – 
 Lead(II) carbonate – 
 Lead(II) chloride – 
 Lead(II) fluoride – 
 Lead(II) hydroxide – 
 Lead(II) iodide – 
 Lead(II) nitrate – 
 Lead(II) oxide – PbO
 Lead(II) phosphate – 
 Lead(II) sulfate – 
 Lead(II) selenide – PbSe
 Lead(II) sulfide – PbS
 Lead(II) telluride – PbTe
 Lead(II) thiocyanate – 
 Lead(II,IV) oxide – 
 Lead(IV) oxide – 
 Lead(IV) sulfide – 
 Lead hydrogen arsenate – 
 Lead styphnate – 
 Lead tetrachloride – 
 Lead tetrafluoride – 
 Lead tetroxide – 
 Lead titanate – 
 Lead zirconate titanate –  (e.g., x = 0.52 is lead zirconium titanate)
 Plumbane –

Li 
 Lithium tetrachloroaluminate – 
 Lithium aluminium hydride – 
 Lithium bromide – LiBr
 Lithium borohydride – 
 Lithium carbonate (Lithium salt) – 
 Lithium chloride – LiCl
 Lithium hypochlorite – LiClO
 Lithium chlorate – 
 Lithium perchlorate – 
 Lithium cobalt oxide – 
 Lithium oxide – 
 Lithium peroxide – 
 Lithium hydride – LiH
 Lithium hydroxide – LiOH
 Lithium iodide – LiI
 Lithium iron phosphate – 
 Lithium nitrate – 
 Lithium sulfide – 
 Lithium sulfite – 
 Lithium sulfate – 
 Lithium superoxide – 
 Lithium hexafluorophosphate –

M

Mg 
 Magnesium antimonide – MgSb
 Magnesium bromide – 
 Magnesium carbonate – 
 Magnesium chloride – 
 Magnesium citrate – 
 Magnesium oxide – MgO
 Magnesium perchlorate – 
 Magnesium phosphate – 
 Magnesium sulfate – 
 Magnesium bicarbonate – 
 Magnesium boride – 
 Magnesium bromide – 
 Magnesium carbide – 
 Magnesium carbonate – 
 Magnesium chloride – 
 Magnesium cyanamide – 
 Magnesium fluoride – 
 Magnesium fluorophosphate – 
 Magnesium gluconate – 
 Magnesium hydride – 
 Dimagnesium phosphate – 
 Magnesium hydroxide – 
 Magnesium hypochlorite – 
 Magnesium iodide – 
 Magnesium molybdate – 
 Magnesium nitrate – 
 Magnesium oxalate – 
 Magnesium peroxide – 
 Magnesium phosphate – 
 Magnesium silicate – 
 Magnesium sulfate – 
 Magnesium sulfide – MgS
 Magnesium titanate – 
 Magnesium tungstate – 
 Magnesium zirconate –

Mn 
 Manganese(II) bromide – 
 Manganese(II) chloride – 
 Manganese(II) hydroxide – 
 Manganese(II) oxide – MnO
 Manganese(II) phosphate – 
 Manganese(II) sulfate – 
 Manganese(II) sulfate monohydrate – 
 Manganese(III) chloride – 
 Manganese(III) oxide – 
 Manganese(IV) fluoride – 
 Manganese(IV) oxide (manganese dioxide) – 
 Manganese(II,III) oxide – 
 Manganese dioxide – 
 Manganese heptoxide –

Hg 
 Mercury(I) chloride – 
 Mercury(I) sulfate – 
 Mercury(II) chloride – 
 Mercury(II) hydride – 
 Mercury(II) selenide – HgSe
 Mercury(II) sulfate – 
 Mercury(II) sulfide – HgS
 Mercury(II) telluride – HgTe
 Mercury(II) thiocyanate – 
 Mercury(IV) fluoride – 
 Mercury fulminate –

Mo 
 Molybdenum(II) bromide – 
 Molybdenum(II) chloride – 
 Molybdenum(III) bromide – 
 Molybdenum(III) chloride – 
 Molybdenum(IV) carbide – MoC
 Molybdenum(IV) chloride – 
 Molybdenum(IV) fluoride – 
 Molybdenum(V) chloride – 
 Molybdenum(V) fluoride – 
 Molybdenum disulfide – 
 Molybdenum hexacarbonyl – 
 Molybdenum hexafluoride – 
 Molybdenum tetrachloride – 
 Molybdenum trioxide – 
 Molybdic acid –

N

Nd 
 Neodymium acetate - 
 Neodymium(III) arsenate – NdAsO4
 Neodymium(II) chloride – 
 Neodymium(III) chloride – 
 Neodymium magnet – 
 Neodymium(II) bromide - 
 Neodymium(III) bromide – 
 Neodymium(III) fluoride – 
 Neodymium(III) hydride - 
 Neodymium(II) iodide - 
 Neodymium(III) iodide – 
 Neodymium molybdate - 
 Neodymium perrhenate - 
 Neodymium(III) sulfide - 
 Neodymium tantalate - 
 Neodymium(III) vanadate -

Np 
 Neptunium(III) fluoride – 
 Neptunium(IV) fluoride – 
 Neptunium(IV) oxide – 
 Neptunium(VI) fluoride –

Ni 
 Nickel(II) carbonate – 
 Nickel(II) chloride – 
 Nickel(II) fluoride – 
 Nickel(II) hydroxide – 
 Nickel(II) nitrate – 
 Nickel(II) oxide – NiO
 Nickel(II) sulfamate – 
 Nickel(II) sulfide – NiS

Nb 
 Niobium(IV) fluoride – 
 Niobium(V) fluoride – 
 Niobium oxychloride – 
 Niobium pentachloride –

N 
 Dinitrogen pentoxide (nitronium nitrate) – 
 Dinitrogen tetrafluoride – 
 Dinitrogen tetroxide – 
 Dinitrogen trioxide – 
 Nitric acid – 
 Nitrous acid – 
 Nitrogen dioxide – 
 Nitrogen monoxide – NO
 Nitrous oxide (dinitrogen monoxide, laughing gas, NOS) – 
 Nitrogen pentafluoride – 
 Nitrogen triiodide –

NO 
 Nitrosonium octafluoroxenate(VI) – 
 Nitrosonium tetrafluoroborate – 
 Nitrosylsulfuric acid –

O

Os 
 Osmium hexafluoride – 
 Osmium tetroxide (osmium(VIII) oxide) – 
 Osmium trioxide (osmium(VI) oxide) –

O 
 Oxybis(tributyltin) – 
 Oxygen difluoride – 
 Ozone – 
 Aluminium oxide – 
 Americium(II) oxide – AmO
 Americium(IV) oxide – 
 Antimony trioxide – 
 Antimony(V) oxide – 
 Arsenic trioxide – 
 Arsenic(V) oxide – 
 Barium oxide – BaO
 Beryllium oxide – BeO
 Bismuth(III) oxide – 
 Bismuth oxychloride – BiOCl
 Boron trioxide – 
 Bromine monoxide – 
 Carbon dioxide – 
 Carbon monoxide – CO
 Cerium(IV) oxide – 
 Chlorine dioxide – 
 Chlorine trioxide – 
 Dichlorine heptaoxide – 
 Dichlorine monoxide – 
 Chromium(III) oxide – 
 Chromium(IV) oxide – 
 Chromium(VI) oxide – 
 Cobalt(II) oxide – CoO
 Copper(I) oxide – 
 Copper(II) oxide – CuO
 Curium(III) oxide – 
 Curium(IV) oxide – 
 Dysprosium(III) oxide – 
 Erbium(III) oxide – 
 Europium(III) oxide – 
 Oxygen difluoride – 
 Dioxygen difluoride – 
 Francium oxide – 
 Gadolinium(III) oxide – 
 Gallium(III) oxide – 
 Germanium dioxide – 
 Gold(III) oxide – 
 Hafnium dioxide – 
 Holmium(III) oxide – 
 Indium(I) oxide – 
 Indium(III) oxide – 
 Iodine pentoxide – 
 Iridium(IV) oxide – 
 Iron(II) oxide – FeO
 Iron(II,III) oxide – 
 Iron(III) oxide – 
 Lanthanum(III) oxide – 
 Lead(II) oxide – PbO
 Lead dioxide – 
 Lithium oxide – 
 Magnesium oxide – MgO
 Potassium oxide – 
 Rubidium oxide – 
 Sodium oxide – 
 Strontium oxide – SrO
 Tellurium dioxide – 
 Uranium(IV) oxide – 
(only simple oxides, oxyhalides, and related compounds, not hydroxides, carbonates, acids, or other compounds listed elsewhere)

P

Pd 
 Palladium(II) chloride – 
 Palladium(II) nitrate – 
 Palladium(II,IV) fluoride – 
 Palladium sulfate – 
 Palladium tetrafluoride –

P 
 Diphosphorus tetrachloride – 
 Diphosphorus tetrafluoride – 
 Diphosphorus tetraiodide – 
 Hexachlorophosphazene – 
 Phosphine – 
 Phosphomolybdic acid – 
 Phosphoric acid – 
 Phosphorous acid (Phosphoric(III) acid) – 
 Phosphoroyl nitride – NPO
 Phosphorus pentabromide – 
 Phosphorus pentafluoride – 
 Phosphorus pentasulfide – 
 Phosphorus pentoxide – 
 Phosphorus sesquisulfide – 
 Phosphorus tribromide – 
 Phosphorus trichloride – 
 Phosphorus trifluoride – 
 Phosphorus triiodide – 
 Phosphotungstic acid – 
 Poly(dichlorophosphazene) –

Pt 
 Platinum(II) chloride – 
 Platinum(IV) chloride – 
 Platinum hexafluoride – 
 Platinum pentafluoride – 
 Platinum tetrafluoride –

Pu 
 Plutonium(III) bromide – 
 Plutonium(III) chloride – 
 Plutonium(III) fluoride – 
 Plutonium dioxide (Plutonium(IV) oxide) – 
 Plutonium hexafluoride – 
 Plutonium hydride – 
 Plutonium tetrafluoride –

Po 
 Polonium hexafluoride – 
 Polonium monoxide – PoO
 Polonium dioxide – 
 Polonium trioxide –

K 
 Potash Alum – 
 Potassium alum – 
 Potassium aluminium fluoride – 
 Potassium amide – 
 Potassium argentocyanide – 
 Potassium arsenite – 
 Potassium azide – 
 Potassium borate – 
 Potassium bromide – KBr
 Potassium bicarbonate – 
 Potassium bifluoride – 
 Potassium bisulfite – 
 Potassium carbonate – 
 Potassium calcium chloride – 
 Potassium chlorate – 
 Potassium chloride – KCl
 Potassium chlorite – 
 Potassium chromate – 
 Potassium cyanide – KCN
 Potassium dichromate – 
 Potassium dithionite – 
 Potassium ferrate – 
 Potassium ferrioxalate – 
 Potassium ferricyanide – 
 Potassium ferrocyanide – 
 Potassium heptafluorotantalate – 
 Potassium hexafluorophosphate – 
 Potassium hydrogen carbonate – 
 Potassium hydrogen fluoride – 
 Potassium hydroxide – KOH
 Potassium iodide – KI
 Potassium iodate – 
 Potassium manganate – 
 Potassium monopersulfate – 
 Potassium nitrate – 
 Potassium perbromate – 
 Potassium perchlorate – 
 Potassium periodate – 
 Potassium permanganate – 
 Potassium sodium tartrate – 
 Potassium sulfate – 
 Potassium sulfite – 
 Potassium sulfide – 
 Potassium tartrate – 
 Potassium tetraiodomercurate(II) – 
 Potassium thiocyanate – KSCN
 Potassium titanyl phosphate – 
 Potassium vanadate – 
 Tripotassium phosphate –

Pr 
 Praseodymium(III) chloride – 
 Praseodymium(III) sulfate – 
 Praseodymium(III) bromide – 
 Praseodymium(III) carbonate – 
 Praseodymium(III) chloride – 
 Praseodymium(III) fluoride – 
 Praseodymium(III) iodide – 
 Praseodymium(III) nitrate – 
 Praseodymium(III) oxide – 
 Praseodymium(III) phosphate – 
 Praseodymium(III) sulfate – 
 Praseodymium(III) sulfide –

Pm 
 Promethium(III) chloride – 
 Promethium(III) oxide – 
 Promethium(III) bromide – 
 Promethium(III) carbonate – 
 Promethium(III) chloride – 
 Promethium(III) fluoride – 
 Promethium(III) iodide – 
 Promethium(III) nitrate – 
 Promethium(III) oxide – 
 Promethium(III) phosphate – 
 Promethium(III) sulfate – 
 Promethium(III) sulfide –

R

Ra 
 Radium bromide – 
 Radium carbonate – 
 Radium chloride – 
 Radium fluoride –

Rn 
 Radon difluoride –

Re 
 Rhenium(IV) oxide – 
 Rhenium(VII) oxide – 
 Rhenium heptafluoride – 
 Rhenium hexafluoride –

Rh 
 Rhodium hexafluoride – 
 Rhodium pentafluoride – 
 Rhodium(III) chloride – 
 Rhodium(III) hydroxide – 
 Rhodium(III) iodide – 
 Rhodium(III) nitrate – 
 Rhodium(III) oxide – 
 Rhodium(III) sulfate – 
 Rhodium(III) sulfide – 
 Rhodium(IV) fluoride – 
 Rhodium(IV) oxide –

Rb 
 Rubidium azide – 
 Rubidium bromide – RbBr
 Rubidium chloride – RbCl
 Rubidium fluoride – RbF
 Rubidium hydrogen sulfate – 
 Rubidium hydroxide – RbOH
 Rubidium iodide – RbI
 Rubidium nitrate – 
 Rubidium oxide – 
 Rubidium telluride –

Ru 
 Ruthenium hexafluoride – 
 Ruthenium pentafluoride – 
 Ruthenium(VIII) oxide – 
 Ruthenium(III) chloride – 
 Ruthenium(IV) oxide –

S

Sm 
 Samarium(II) iodide – 
 Samarium(III) chloride – 
 Samarium(III) oxide – 
 Samarium(III) bromide – 
 Samarium(III) carbonate – 
 Samarium(III) chloride – 
 Samarium(III) fluoride – 
 Samarium(III) iodide – 
 Samarium(III) nitrate – 
 Samarium(III) oxide – 
 Samarium(III) phosphate – 
 Samarium(III) sulfate – 
 Samarium(III) sulfide –

Sc 
 Scandium(III) fluoride – 
 Scandium(III) nitrate – 
 Scandium(III) oxide – 
 Scandium(III) triflate –

Se 
 Selenic acid – 
 Selenious acid – 
 Selenium dibromide – 
 Selenium dioxide – 
 Selenium disulfide – 
 Selenium hexafluoride – 
 Selenium hexasulfide – 
 Selenium oxybromide – 
 Selenium oxydichloride – 
 Selenium tetrachloride – 
 Selenium tetrafluoride – 
 Selenium trioxide – 
 Selenoyl fluoride –

Si 
 Silane – 
 Silica gel – 
 Silicic acid – 
 Silicochloroform, trichlorosilane – 
 Silicofluoric acid – 
 Silicon boride – 
 Silicon carbide (carborundum) – SiC
 Silicon dioxide – 
 Silicon monoxide – SiO
 Silicon nitride – 
 Silicon tetrabromide – 
 Silicon tetrachloride – 
 Silicon tetrafluoride – 
 Silicon tetraiodide – 
 Thortveitite –

Ag 
 Silver(I) fluoride – AgF
 Silver(II) fluoride – 
 Silver acetylide – 
 Silver argentocyanide – 
 Silver azide – 
 Silver bromate – 
 Silver bromide – AgBr
 Silver chlorate – 
 Silver chloride – AgCl
 Silver chromate – 
 Silver fluoroborate – 
 Silver fulminate – AgCNO
 Silver hydroxide – AgOH
 Silver iodide – AgI
 Silver nitrate – 
 Silver nitride – 
 Silver oxide – 
 Silver perchlorate – 
 Silver permanganate – 
 Silver phosphate (silver orthophosphate) – 
 Silver subfluoride – 
 Silver sulfate – 
 Silver sulfide –

Na 
 Sodamide – 
 Sodium aluminate – 
 Sodium arsenate – 
 Sodium azide – 
 Sodium bicarbonate – 
 Sodium biselenide – NaSeH
 Sodium bisulfate – 
 Sodium bisulfite – 
 Sodium borate – 
 Sodium borohydride – 
 Sodium bromate – 
 Sodium bromide – NaBr
 Sodium bromite – 
 Sodium carbide – 
 Sodium carbonate – 
 Sodium chlorate – 
 Sodium chloride – NaCl
 Sodium chlorite – 
 Sodium cobaltinitrite – 
 Sodium copper tetrachloride – 
 Sodium cyanate – NaCNO
 Sodium cyanide – NaCN
 Sodium dichromate – 
 Sodium dioxide – 
 Sodium dithionite – 
 Sodium ferrocyanide – 
 Sodium fluoride – NaF
 Sodium fluorosilicate – 
 Sodium formate – HCOONa
 Sodium hydride – NaH
 Sodium hydrogen carbonate (Sodium bicarbonate) – 
 Sodium hydrosulfide – NaSH
 Sodium hydroxide – NaOH
 Sodium hypobromite – NaOBr
 Sodium hypochlorite – NaOCl
 Sodium hypoiodite – NaOI
 Sodium hypophosphite – 
 Sodium iodate – 
 Sodium iodide – NaI
 Sodium manganate – 
 Sodium molybdate – 
 Sodium monofluorophosphate (MFP) – 
 Sodium nitrate – 
 Sodium nitrite – 
 Sodium nitroprusside – 
 Sodium oxide – 
 Sodium perborate – 
 Sodium perbromate – 
 Sodium percarbonate – 
 Sodium perchlorate – 
 Sodium periodate – 
 Sodium permanganate – 
 Sodium peroxide – 
 Sodium peroxycarbonate – 
 Sodium perrhenate – 
 Sodium persulfate – 
 Sodium phosphate; see trisodium phosphate – 
 Sodium selenate – 
 Sodium selenide – 
 Sodium selenite – 
 Sodium silicate – 
 Sodium sulfate – 
 Sodium sulfide – 
 Sodium sulfite – 
 Sodium tartrate – 
 Sodium tellurite – 
 Sodium tetrachloroaluminate – 
 Sodium tetrafluoroborate – 
 Sodium thioantimoniate – 
 Sodium thiocyanate – NaSCN
 Sodium thiosulfate – 
 Sodium tungstate – 
 Sodium uranate – 
 Sodium zincate – 
 Trisodium phosphate –

Sr 
 Strontium bromide – 
 Strontium carbonate – 
 Strontium chloride – 
 Strontium fluoride – 
 Strontium hydroxide – 
 Strontium iodide – 
 Strontium nitrate – 
 Strontium oxide – SrO
 Strontium titanate – 
 Strontium bicarbonate – 
 Strontium boride – 
 Strontium bromide – 
 Strontium carbide – 
 Strontium carbonate – 
 Strontium chloride – 
 Strontium cyanamide – 
 Strontium fluoride – 
 Strontium fluorophosphate – 
 Strontium gluconate – 
 Strontium hydride – 
 Strontium hydrogen phosphate – 
 Strontium hydroxide – 
 Strontium hypochlorite – 
 Strontium iodide – 
 Strontium molybdate – 
 Strontium nitrate – 
 Strontium oxalate – 
 Strontium oxide – SrO
 Strontium peroxide – 
 Strontium phosphate – 
 Strontium silicate – 
 Strontium sulfate – 
 Strontium sulfide – SrS
 Strontium titanate – 
 Strontium tungstate – 
 Strontium zirconate –

S 
 Disulfur decafluoride – 
 Hydrogen sulfide (sulfane) – 
 Pyrosulfuric acid – 
 Sulfamic acid – 
 Sulfur dibromide – 
 Sulfur dioxide – 
 Sulfur hexafluoride – 
 Sulfur tetrafluoride – 
 Sulfuric acid – 
 Sulfurous acid – 
 Sulfuryl chloride – 
 Tetrasulfur tetranitride – 
 Persulfuric acid (Caro's acid) –

T

Ta 
 Tantalum arsenide – TaAs
 Tantalum carbide – TaC
 Tantalum pentafluoride – 
 Tantalum(V) oxide –

Tc 
 Technetium hexafluoride – 
 Ammonium pertechnetate – 
 Sodium pertechnetate –

Te 
 Ditellurium bromide – 
 Telluric acid – 
 Tellurium dioxide – 
 Tellurium hexafluoride – 
 Tellurium tetrabromide – 
 Tellurium tetrachloride – 
 Tellurium tetrafluoride – 
 Tellurium tetraiodide – 
 Tellurous acid – 
 Beryllium telluride – BeTe
 Bismuth telluride – 
 Cadmium telluride – CdTe
 Cadmium zinc telluride – 
 Dimethyltelluride – 
 Mercury Cadmium Telluride – 
 Lead telluride – PbTe
 Mercury telluride – HgTe
 Mercury zinc telluride – 
 Silver telluride – 
 Tin telluride – SnTe
 Zinc telluride – ZnTe
 Teflic acid – 
 Telluric acid – 
 Sodium tellurite – 
 Tellurium dioxide – 
 Tellurium hexafluoride – 
 Tellurium tetrafluoride – 
 Tellurium tetrachloride –

Tb 
 Terbium(III) chloride – 
 Terbium(III) bromide – 
 Terbium(III) carbonate – 
 Terbium(III) chloride – 
 Terbium(III) fluoride – 
 Terbium(III) iodide – 
 Terbium(III) nitrate – 
 Terbium(III) oxide – 
 Terbium(III) phosphate – 
 Terbium(III) sulfate – 
 Terbium(III) sulfide –

Tl 
 Thallium(I) bromide – TlBr
 Thallium(I) carbonate – 
 Thallium(I) fluoride – TlF
 Thallium(I) sulfate – 
 Thallium(III) oxide – 
 Thallium(III) sulfate – 
 Thallium triiodide – 
 Thallium antimonide – TlSb
 Thallium arsenide – TlAs
 Thallium(III) bromide – 
 Thallium(III) chloride – 
 Thallium(III) fluoride – 
 Thallium(I) iodide – TlI
 Thallium(III) nitrate – 
 Thallium(I) oxide – 
 Thallium(III) oxide – 
 Thallium phosphide – TlP
 Thallium(III) selenide – 
 Thallium(III) sulfate – 
 Thallium(III) sulfide – 
 TrimethylThallium – 
 Thallium(I) hydroxide – TlOH

SO 
 Thionyl chloride – 
 Thionyl tetrafluoride –

ClS 
 Thiophosgene – 
 Thiophosphoryl chloride –

Th 
 Thorium(IV) nitrate – 
 Thorium(IV) sulfate – 
 Thorium dioxide – 
 Thorium tetrafluoride –

Tm 
 Thulium(III) bromide – 
 Thulium(III) chloride – 
 Thulium(III) oxide –

Sn 
 Stannane – 
 Tin(II) bromide – 
 Tin(II) chloride (stannous chloride) – 
 Tin(II) fluoride – 
 Tin(II) hydroxide – 
 Tin(II) iodide – 
 Tin(II) oxide – SnO
 Tin(II) sulfate – 
 Tin(II) sulfide – SnS
 Tin(IV) bromide – 
 Tin(IV) chloride – 
 Tin(IV) fluoride – 
 Tin(IV) iodide – 
 Tin(IV) oxide – 
 Tin(IV) sulfide – 
 Tin(IV) cyanide – 
 Tin selenide – 
 Tin telluride – SnTe

Ti 
 Hexafluorotitanic acid – 
 Titanium(II) chloride – 
 Titanium(II) oxide – TiO
 Titanium(II) sulfide – TiS
 Titanium(III) bromide – 
 Titanium(III) chloride – 
 Titanium(III) fluoride – 
 Titanium(III) iodide – 
 Titanium(III) oxide – 
 Titanium(III) phosphide – TiP
 Titanium(IV) bromide (titanium tetrabromide) – 
 Titanium(IV) carbide – TiC
 Titanium(IV) chloride (titanium tetrachloride) – 
 Titanium(IV) hydride – 
 Titanium(IV) iodide (titanium tetraiodide) – 
 Titanium carbide – TiC
 Titanium diboride – 
 Titanium dioxide (titanium(IV) oxide) – 
 Titanium diselenide – 
 Titanium disilicide – 
 Titanium disulfide – 
 Titanium nitrate – 
 Titanium nitride – TiN
 Titanium perchlorate – 
 Titanium silicon carbide – 
 Titanium tetrabromide – 
 Titanium tetrafluoride – 
 Titanium tetraiodide –

TiO 
 Titanyl sulfate –

W 
 Tungsten(VI) chloride – 
 Tungsten(VI) fluoride – 
 Tungsten boride – 
 Tungsten carbide – WC
 Tungstic acid – 
 Tungsten hexacarbonyl –

U

U 
 Triuranium octaoxide (pitchblende or yellowcake) – 
 Uranium hexafluoride – 
 Uranium pentafluoride – 
 Uranium sulfate – 
 Uranium tetrachloride – 
 Uranium tetrafluoride – 
 Uranium(III) chloride – 
 Uranium(IV) chloride – 
 Uranium(V) chloride – 
 Uranium hexachloride – 
 Uranium(IV) fluoride – 
 Uranium pentafluoride – 
 Uranium(VI) fluoride – 
 Uranyl peroxide – 
 Uranium dioxide –

UO2 
 Uranyl carbonate – 
 Uranyl chloride – 
 Uranyl fluoride – 
 Uranyl hydroxide – 
 Uranyl hydroxide – 
 Uranyl nitrate – 
 Uranyl sulfate –

V

V 
 Vanadium(II) chloride – 
 Vanadium(II) oxide – VO
 Vanadium(III) bromide – 
 Vanadium(III) chloride – 
 Vanadium(III) fluoride – 
 Vanadium(III) nitride – VN
 Vanadium(III) oxide – 
 Vanadium(IV) chloride – 
 Vanadium(IV) fluoride – 
 Vanadium(IV) oxide – 
 Vanadium(IV) sulfate – 
 Vanadium(V) oxide – 
 Vanadium carbide – VC
 Vanadium oxytrichloride (Vanadium(V) oxide trichloride) – 
 Vanadium pentafluoride – 
 Vanadium tetrachloride – 
 Vanadium tetrafluoride –

W 
 Water –

X

Xe 
 Perxenic acid – 
 Xenon difluoride – 
 Xenon hexafluoride – 
 Xenon hexafluoroplatinate – 
 Xenon tetrafluoride – 
 Xenon tetroxide – 
 Xenic acid –

Y

Yb 
 Ytterbium(III) chloride – 
 Ytterbium(III) oxide – 
 Ytterbium(III) sulfate – 
 Ytterbium(III) bromide – 
 Ytterbium(III) carbonate – 
 Ytterbium(III) chloride – 
 Ytterbium(III) fluoride – 
 Ytterbium(III) iodide – 
 Ytterbium(III) nitrate – 
 Ytterbium(III) oxide – 
 Ytterbium(III) phosphate – 
 Ytterbium(III) sulfate – 
 Ytterbium(III) sulfide –

Y 

 Yttrium(III) antimonide – YSb
 Yttrium(III) arsenate – 
 Yttrium(III) arsenide – YAs
 Yttrium(III) bromide – 
 Yttrium(III) fluoride – 
 Yttrium(III) oxide – 
 Yttrium(III) nitrate – 
 Yttrium(III) sulfide – 
 Yttrium(III) sulfate – 
 Yttrium aluminium garnet – 
 Yttrium barium copper oxide – 
 Yttrium cadmium – YCd
 Yttrium copper – YCu
 Yttrium gold – YAu
 Yttrium iridium – YIr
 Yttrium iron garnet – 
 Yttrium magnesium – YMg
 Yttrium phosphate – 
 Yttrium phosphide – YP
 Yttrium rhodium – YRh
 Yttrium silver – YAg
 Yttrium zinc – YZn

Z

Zn 
 Zinc arsenide – 
 Zinc bromide – 
 Zinc carbonate – 
 Zinc chloride – 
 Zinc cyanide – 
 Zinc diphosphide – 
 Zinc fluoride – 
 Zinc iodide – 
 Zinc nitrate – 
 Zinc oxide – ZnO
 Zinc phosphide – 
 Zinc pyrophosphate – 
 Zinc selenate – 
 Zinc selenide – ZnSe
 Zinc selenite – 
 Zinc selenocyanate – 
 Zinc sulfate – 
 Zinc sulfide – ZnS
 Zinc sulfite – 
 Zinc telluride – ZnTe
 Zinc thiocyanate – 
 Zinc tungstate –

Zr 
 Zirconia hydrate – 
 Zirconium boride – 
 Zirconium carbide – ZrC
 Zirconium(IV) chloride – 
 Zirconium(IV) oxide – 
 Zirconium hydroxide – 
 Zirconium orthosilicate – 
 Zirconium nitride – ZrN
 Zirconium tetrafluoride – 
 Zirconium tetrahydroxide – 
 Zirconium tungstate – 
 Zirconyl bromide – 
 Zirconyl chloride – 
 Zirconyl nitrate – 
 Zirconyl sulfate – 
 Zirconium carbide – ZrC
 Zirconium dioxide – 
 Zirconium nitride – ZrN
 Zirconium tetrachloride – 
 Zirconium(IV) sulfide – 
 Zirconium(IV) silicide – 
 Zirconium(IV) silicate – 
 Zirconium(IV) fluoride – 
 Zirconium(IV) bromide – 
 Zirconium(IV) iodide – 
 Zirconium(IV) hydroxide – 
 Schwartz's reagent – 
 Zirconium propionate – 
 Zirconium tungstate – 
 Zirconium(II) hydride – 
 Lead zirconate titanate –

See also
 Dictionary of chemical formulas
 List of alchemical substances
 List of biomolecules
 List of compounds
 List of copper salts
 List of inorganic compounds named after people
 List of minerals
 List of organic compounds
 List of organic salts
 Named inorganic compounds
 Polyatomic ions

References

External links 
 Inorganic Molecules made thinkable, an interactive visualisation showing inorganic compounds for an array of common metal and non-metal ions

Inorganic
Inorganic Compounds